Pratighaat is an  Indian Assamese language action drama and romance film directed by Achinta Shankar, written by Rajdweep and produced by Narendra N Sinha and Nalini Roy Gayari. The film has been released under the banner of Issue Production and distributed by Norman Studio Works. The film features Amrita Gogoi and Diganta Hazarika in lead roles while Ashramika Saikia as child artist. It is scheduled to release on 6 December 2019

Cast
The cast include the following actors in the film

 Zubeen Garg (special appearance in the song "Pratighaat")
 Diganta Hazarika 
 Amrita Gogoi 
 Aimee Baruah 
 Hiranya Deka 
 Bishnu Kharghoria 
 Padmarag Goswami 
 Ashramika Saikia
 Achintya Sharma

Soundtrack
The songs are composed by Zubeen Garg, Rahul Dav Nath, Diganta Bharati and Poran Borkotoky respectively.

References

External links
  

2010s Assamese-language films